Sattur A. G. Subramaniam, (1916–1977) was a vocalist in the carantic tradition. His vocals were enriched with brigas and high speeds.

Birth
Sattur A. G. Subramaniam was born to Ganesh Satrigal and Thailammal in Angarai, Tiruchirapalli.

Education
He received his Sangita Bhushanam diploma from Annamalai University in 1936, where he was taught by other distinguished stalwarts like Tiruvaiyaru Sabhesa Aiyer and Thanjavur Ponnaiah Pillai.

Style of Singing
AGS was deeply involved in his music, whenever he sang. His songs were abundant with bhava rasa.

"A purist to the last, his raga alapanas and pallavi elaboration in different ragas were masterpieces of expertise, lakshana - lakshya elegance, high level artistic exuberance of manodharma"

His singing endeared him to several of his famous contemporaries like GNB, Madurai Mani Iyer and Ariyakudi Ramanuja Iyengar.

Inaugurating the Sri Rama Navami concerts at Coimbatore was a privilege that was accorded to only the best singers. AGS was given this privilege for several years, consistently.

Disciples
AGS was a much loved guru, who was affectionate towards all his disciples. His famous disciples were Sirkazhi V. R. Subramaniam, Sirkazhi R. Jayaraman, Musiri Rangarajan, Sitamani Srinivasan, Sulochana Pattabhiraman, Tiruchi N. Natarajan among several others including his two daughters. His eightieth birth anniversary was celebrated on 15 August 1995 by his disciples.

Music
Only two gramophone records and three cassettes of his rendition survive today.

References

Male Carnatic singers
Carnatic singers
1916 births
1977 deaths
20th-century Indian male classical singers
Musicians from Tiruchirappalli
Singers from Tamil Nadu